The National Council of Churches in Korea (NCCK) is a Christian ecumenical organization founded in Korea in 1924 as the National Christian Council in Korea. It is a member of the World Council of Churches and the Christian Conference of Asia.

Member churches
There are now 9 member churches in the National Council of Churches in Korea:
 Anglican Church of Korea
 Assembly of God of Korea
 Lutheran Church in Korea
 Korea Evangelical Church
 Korean Methodist Church
 Korean Orthodox Church
 Presbyterian Church in the Republic of Korea
 Presbyterian Church of Korea (TongHap)
 The Salvation Army in Korea

See also 
Christian Council of Korea
Christianity in Korea
Korean Christian Federation

References

External links 
 
World Council of Churches listing

Christian organizations established in 1924
Members of the World Council of Churches
Christian organizations based in Asia
Christianity in Korea
National councils of churches